The first-generation Chevrolet Camaro is an American muscle car introduced by Chevrolet in the fall of 1966 for the 1967 model year. It rode on a brand-new rear wheel drive GM F-body platform and was available as a 2-door, 2+2 seat, hardtop, and convertible. The F-body was shared with the Pontiac Firebird for all generations. A 230 cu in Chevrolet straight-6 was standard, with several Chevy V8s available as options. The first-generation Camaro was built through the 1969 model year.

Almost all of 1967–1969 Camaros were built in the two U.S. assembly plants: Norwood, Ohio and Van Nuys, California. There were also five non-U.S. Camaro assembly plants in countries that required local assembly and content. These plants were located in the Philippines, Belgium, Switzerland, Venezuela, and Peru.

Options
There were 8 (in 1967), 10 (in 1968), and 12 (in 1969) different engines available in 1967-1969 Camaros. There were several optional transmissions. A four-speed manual was available with any engine. The two-speed "Powerglide" automatic transmission was available all three years. The three-speed "Turbo Hydra-Matic 350" automatic became available starting in 1968. The optional automatic for SS 396 cars was the Turbo 400 three-speed automatic. A semi-automatic "Torque-Drive" two-speed transmission was available on six-cylinder models.

There were a plethora of other options available all three years, including three main packages:

The RS was an appearance package that included hidden headlights (the doors of which slid horizontally behind the grille when opened), revised taillights with back-up lights under the rear bumper, RS badging, and exterior bright trim. It was available on any model.

The SS featured non-functional air inlets on the hood, special striping, and SS badging.

The Z/28 performance package was designed (with further modifications) to compete in the SCCA Trans-Am Series. It included a solid-lifter  V8, 4-speed transmission, power disc brakes, and two wide "skunk" stripes down the hood and trunk lid.

The idea of offering a wide variety of packages and numerous options was to "blanket" Camaro's end of the personal car market segment with everything from an entry-level 6-cylinder engine to high-performance V8 engines.

1967 

The body style for the 1967 Camaro was designed by the same team that designed the new 1965 edition of the Corvair.  The Camaro shared the subframe / semi-unibody design with the 1968 Chevy II Nova. Almost 80 factory-installed and 40 dealer options, including three main trim packages, were available: the RS, the SS, and the Z/28.

The SS featured non-functional air inlets on the hood, special striping, and SS badging on the grille, front fenders, gas cap, and horn button. It was possible to order both the SS and RS options, making it a RS/SS. In 1967, a Camaro RS/SS convertible with a 396 engine paced the Indianapolis 500.

Z/28
The Z/28 option code was introduced in December 1966 for the 1967 model year. It was the brainchild of Vince Piggins, who conceived offering "virtually race-ready" Camaros for sale  from any Chevrolet dealer. This option package was not mentioned in any sales literature, so it was unknown to most buyers. The Z/28 option featured a high-output small-block  V8 that had been designed for racing in the 5 litre (305 cu in) class in the then very popular Trans-Am racing series. In 1969, it was intended as a head-to-head competitor for the Ford Boss 302 Mustang. It had a  stroke crankshaft with  bore, an aluminum intake manifold, and a 4-barrel vacuum secondary 780 cfm Holley carburetor. 

Chevrolet wanted to keep the horsepower rating at less than 1 hp per cubic inch, for insurance premium calculations and for classification in racing.

The Z/28 also came with upgraded suspension, front disc power brakes, and a 4-speed Muncie close-ratio manual transmission. Posi-traction was available as an option. The Z/28 included wide racing stripes on the hood and trunk lid (that could be deleted at no charge), a '302' front fender emblems on the 1967 and early 1968 cars, and 'Z/28' emblems in late 1968 and 1969. It was also possible to combine the Z/28 package with the RS package.

A total of 602 Z/28s equipped Camaros were sold in 1967, along with approximately 100 Indianapolis Pace Car replicas. The 1967 and 1968 Z/28s did not have the cowl induction hood, optional on the 1969 Z/28s. The 1967 Z28 received air from an open-element air cleaner or from an optional cowl plenum duct attached to the side of the air cleaner that ran to the firewall and got air from the cowl vents. 15-inch rally wheels were included with Z/28s while all other 1967-9 Camaros had 14-inch wheels.

The origin of the Z/28 nameplate came from the RPO codes - RPO Z28 was the code for the Special Performance Package. RPO Z27 was for the Super Sport package.

Swiss assembled cars 
The Swiss-built Camaros were not available with the three-speed manual and had a limited-slip differential and front disc brakes as standard. Some additional safety equipment was also standard.

Production numbers

1968 

The styling of the 1968 Camaro was very similar to the 1967 design. With the introduction of Astro Ventilation, a fresh-air-inlet system, the side vent windows were deleted. Side marker lights were added on the front and rear fenders as part of safety requirements for all 1968 vehicles. It also had a more pointed front grille and divided rear taillights. The front running lights (on non-RS models) were also changed from circular to oval. The big-block SS models received chrome hood inserts that imitated velocity stacks and low-gloss black rear tail light panel.

The rear shock absorber mounting was staggered to resolve wheel hop issues and higher performance models received multi-leaf rear springs instead of single-leaf units. The  was not available as a Regular Production Option (RPO).

Chevrolet's Special Production Division had to convince Chevrolet's General Manager Pete Estes, but the General Manager only drove convertible vehicles, and the Z/28 was never produced as a convertible. A Central Office Production Order (COPO) was placed for the only Z/28 convertible Camaro built. The car was parked in the executive garage which Pete Estes had access to. Upon driving the vehicle, he promptly gave approval for promoting the Z/28. A 1968 Z/28 competed in the 1971 British Saloon Car Championship at Crystal Palace in a three-way battle for the lead, a race which was later featured in the "Sporting Moments" episode of BBC's 100 Greatest series.

Production numbers

1969 

The 1969 Camaro carried over the previous year's drivetrain and major mechanical components, but all-new sheet metal, except the hood trunk lid and roof, gave the car a substantially sportier look. The grille was redesigned with a heavy "V" cant and deeply inset headlights. New door skins, rear quarter panels, and rear valance panel also gave the car a much lower, wider, more aggressive look. This styling would serve for the 1969 model year only.

To increase competitiveness in the SCCA Trans-Am racing series, optional four-wheel disc brakes with four-piston calipers were made available during the year, under RPO JL8, for US$500.30. This system used components from the Corvette and made for a major improvement in the braking capability and was a key to winning the Trans-Am championship. The option was expensive and only 206 units were produced.

The Rally Sport (RS) option, RPO Z22, includes a special black-painted grille with concealed headlights and headlight washers, fender striping (except when sport striping or Z28 Special Performance Package is specified), simulated rear fender louvers, front and rear wheel opening moldings, black body sill, RS emblems on grille, steering wheel and rear panel, Rally Sport front fender nameplates, bright accented taillights, back-up lights below rear bumper; also includes bright roof drip moldings on Sport Coupe. $131.65, 37,773 built. This option could be added to any other option (i.e., SS or Z/28), making the model an RS/SS or an RS/Z28.

It was backed by Muncie four-speed with a new-for-69 standard Hurst shifter and connected to a 12-bolt rear axle with standard 3.73 gears. The 302 featured 11:1 compression, forged pistons, forged steel crankshaft and connecting rods, solid lifter camshaft, and Holley carburetion on a dual-plane intake manifold. A dual four-barrel crossram intake manifold was available as a dealer-installed option.

The 1969 model year was exceptionally long, extending into November 1969, due to manufacturing problems that delayed the introduction of the second generation model planned for 1970.

Production numbers

COPO 427s 

Requests from dealers (notably Don Yenko in PA, Baldwin-Motion in NY, Nickey in IL and Dana in CA) who had been dealer-installing  engines in the Camaro prompted Chevrolet to use an ordering process usually used on fleet and special orders (taxis, trucks, etc.) to offer 427 engines in the Camaro. Two Central Office Production Orders (COPO), numbers 9560 and 9561, were offered in the 1969 model year.

Yenko ordered 201 of these cars to convert them into Yenko Camaros. Other dealers also became aware of the L72 engine package. Around 1,000 Camaros were fitted with the L72 engine option.

The COPO 9560 used an all-aluminum  big-block called the ZL-1 and was designed specifically for drag racing. The package was conceived by drag racer Dick Harrell, and ordered through Fred Gibb Chevrolet in La Harpe, IL, with the intention of entering NHRA Super Stock racing. A total of 69 ZL-1 Camaros were produced. The engine alone was at over US$4,000—or more than the cost of a base V8 Camaro. With exhaust changes and tuning, gross horsepower could be increased to over 500.

The ZL1 engines were hand-assembled in a process that took 16 hours each, in a room that Corvette Chief Engineer Zora Arkus-Duntov described as "surgically clean." All the ZL1 engines were manufactured at the Tonawanda Assembly Plant before being installed in Corvettes and Camaros or sold over the counter to racers.

First-generation engines

References

External links 

 Camaro Research Group - reference data for 1967-1969 Camaros
 

Camaro 1
Chevrolet Camaro 1
Chevrolet Camaro 1
Chevrolet Camaro 1
Chevrolet Camaro 1
Cars introduced in 1966
Cars discontinued in 1969